Nekemias is a genus of flowering plants belonging to the family Vitaceae.

Its native range is Assam to Temperate Eastern Asia and Western and Central Malesia, Central and Eastern USA.

Species
Plants of the World Online currently includes:
Nekemias arborea 
Nekemias cantoniensis  (synonym N. hypoglauca)
Nekemias celebica 
Nekemias chaffanjonii 
Nekemias gongshanensis 
Nekemias grossedentata 
Nekemias megalophylla 
Nekemias rubifolia

References

Vitaceae
Vitaceae genera